Sidirokastro, officially referred to as Sidirokastron, is a semi-mountainous settlement near Avlonas and is administratively part of the Municipality of Trifylia, in Messinia, Greece. Sidirokastro was the seat of the old Municipality of Avlona (1835–1912) and also of the former Municipality of Avlona of Messinia (1997–2010).

History
The oldest village of Sidirokastro was located inside and around the homonymous castle, Sidirokastro and was a large settlement, according to its ruins, which still exist today. The history of the old village is directly related to the history of this Castle and its area, which was under the control of the Principality of Achaia and then the Despotate of Mystras.

During the pre-revolutionary period, the Revolution of 1821 and the struggles that followed until the final liberation of the area, several groups of rebels acted in the area of Sidirokastro.

References

Populated places in Messenia